Events from the year 1911 in Denmark.

Incumbents
 Monarch – Frederick VIII
 Prime minister – Klaus Berntsen

Events
 21 April – The Danish Society for Nature Conservation is founded.

Undated
The Royal Danish Navy begins building its fleet of Havmanden-class submarines.

Books
Morten Korch – Sin egen sti

Sports
 Date unknown  Thorvald Ellegaard wins gold in men's sprint at the 1911 UCI Track Cycling World Championships.

Films
A Victim of the Mormons, directed by August Blom

Births
 14 January – Clara Østø, actress (died 1983)
 20 February – Peter Glob, archaeologist (died 1985)
 24 June – Helga Pedersen, politician (died 1980)
 3 July  Jonas Bruun, lawyer (died 1977)
 17 July – Anker Jacobsen, tennis player (died 1975)
 7 August – Else Jarlbak, actress (died 1963)

Deaths
 3 February – Christian Bohr, physician (born 1855)
 18 February – Emil Vett, businessman (born 1843)
 12 September – Niels Andersen, businessman (born 1835)
 19 September – Gustav Budde-Lund, zoologist (born 1846)
 5 December – Edvard Petersen, painter (born 1841)

References

 
Denmark
Years of the 20th century in Denmark
1910s in Denmark
Denmark